Foreign Correspondent is a weekly Australian documentary series and current affairs program screened on ABC, Tuesdays at  (AEDT), Wednesdays at 11.30am as well as on ABC News on Saturdays at 6.30pm. It is also available on iView or on the Foreign Correspondent website. ABC News also repeats the program on Thursdays at 2.30pm if parliament is in recess. Its aim is to provide information about the happenings in other countries either on the light side of life or during crises.

Foreign Correspondent has been one of Australia's leading programs in its genre since its premiere, and has won several awards, including the Walkley Awards for Excellence in Journalism and White House News Photographers' Association. Since its launch, the news teams have travelled more than 170 countries and produced more than 1,650 reports.

Impact
Correspondents on the program have received attention from other media outlets than the Australian Broadcasting Corporation. Crikey covered Eric Campbell's presence in Thailand after he became a subject of the country's lèse majesté laws, which forbids criticism of the monarchy. The Sydney Morning Herald website featured an article about foreign correspondent Sally Sara as she opened up about her experience in an Afghan military hospital.

There are currently 11 correspondents based in various regions around the world for Foreign Correspondent, including Steve Cannane in Europe and Avani Dias in South Asia. Their work can be found on several media platforms: TV, radio, online and on social media.

In 2014, China warned ABC that there would be wider implications over its program on Xinjiang.

See also

 List of longest-running Australian television series

Notes

External links 
 
 
 
 Foreign Correspondent archives - abc.net.au

Australian non-fiction television series
Australian Broadcasting Corporation original programming
1992 Australian television series debuts
2000s Australian television series
2010s Australian television series
English-language television shows